Waterworth is a surname. Notable people with the surname include:

 Alan William Waterworth (1931–2016), Lord Lieutenant of Merseyside
 Andrew Waterworth (born 1986), Northern Ireland footballer
 Edith Alice Waterworth (1873–1957), Australian welfare worker
 James Waterworth (1806–1876), English Catholic missionary priest
 Luke Waterworth (born 1996), Rugby League footballer
 Peter Waterworth (born 1957), British barrister and diplomat